Transcrime is a Research Centre on Transnational Crime of the Università Cattolica del Sacro Cuore of Milan. The Centre, directed by Ernesto U. Savona, Professor of Criminology at the Università Cattolica del Sacro Cuore in Milan, represents the multi-year union between experience and innovation in the field of criminological research.

Transcrime has offices in Milan. In each office there is a team of researchers and secretaria/management personnel.

Transcrime also plays an important role in the support and development of education activities at Università Cattolica del Sacro Cuore of Milan. Its principal aim is to achieve a strong integration between scientific innovation and academic education. In particular, since the academic year 2005/06, Transcrime has been managing the MA programme in Applied Social Sciences (curriculum Crime&Tech, Crime Sciences and Technologies for Security, under the coordination of Professor Savona). In addition, Transcrime has been contributing to the development of the International Ph.D. programme in Criminology, coordinated by Professor Savona, which, at the moment, is the only third level academic course study dedicated to criminological issues in Italy.

External links
  - Official website
 Università del Sacro Cuore of Milan

Università Cattolica del Sacro Cuore
Criminology organizations